is a district located in Niigata, Japan.

As of July 1, 2019, the district has an estimated population of 10,327 and a density of 10.8 persons per km2. The total area is 952.89 km2.

Towns and villages 
The district consists of one town:

 Aga

History 

 The district was once belonged to Aizu clan and later became part of Wakamatsu Prefecture then to Fukushima Prefecture until 1889 when the district was transferred to Niigata Prefecture.

Recent mergers 
 On April 1, 2005 - The towns of Kanose and Tsugawa, and the villages of Kamikawa and Mikawa were merged to form the town of Aga.

Districts in Niigata Prefecture